Peter Sanders (born 19 March 1961) is a British former cyclist. He competed in the individual road race and the team time trial events at the 1984 Summer Olympics.

References

External links
 

1961 births
Living people
British male cyclists
Olympic cyclists of Great Britain
Cyclists at the 1984 Summer Olympics
People from Hillingdon
Cyclists from Greater London